David Zalcberg ([zaltsberg]?) (born 4 May 1981, Melbourne, Victoria) is a left-handed Australian former table tennis player.

Table tennis career 
Zalcberg began playing table tennis at age of 12. He represented Australia at the 1997 Maccabiah Games in Israel. He was part of the Australian delegation that was involved in the tragic bridge collapse during the opening ceremony of the games.

In 2003, Zalcberg competed in the World Table Tennis Championships in singles. He competed with the Australian national team in the 2004 World Teams Championships. They finished 37th.

Career highlights 
International
 Athens Olympics – Round of 32 Men's doubles
 Gold Medal, Oceania Games, Men's Doubles, 2004
 Bronze Medal, Commonwealth Games, Team event, 2004
 2006 Commonwealth Games, where in spite of being injured, he defeated a highly favored opponent from Singapore
 Silver Medal, Finland Open, Team event, 2005

National
 Australian Under 20 Singles & Doubles Champion 2001
 Australian Men's Doubles Champion 2005

Highest rankings 
National: 4th Singles 2004.  1st Doubles 2005.
International: World Teams Championships 2004 – ranked 37th

Awards
Zalcberg was named Maccabi Australia sportsman of the year in March 2007.

References

External links 
 Table Tennis Australia
 "Zalcberg Named Sportsman of the Year," 3/15/07

See also 
 Australia at the 2006 Commonwealth Games
 Table tennis at the 2004 Summer Olympics – Men's doubles
 Mount Scopus Memorial College

1981 births
Living people
Australian Jews
Sportspeople from Melbourne
Jewish table tennis players
Australian male table tennis players
Maccabiah Games competitors for Australia
Table tennis players at the 1997 Maccabiah Games
Commonwealth Games competitors for Australia
Olympic table tennis players of Australia
Table tennis players at the 2004 Summer Olympics
Table tennis players at the 2008 Summer Olympics
Maccabiah Games table tennis players
Table tennis players at the 2006 Commonwealth Games